Butrint Vishaj (born 9 July 1987 in Neunkirchen) is an Austrian–born ethnic Albanian footballer who plays for ASK Horitschon in the Landesliga Burgenland, the fourth tier of Austrian football.

Career

Early career
Vishaj was born to ethnic Albanian Kosovan parents in Neunkirchen, Austria, where he was also raised. He began playing football for SV Grünbach in 1994 where he would play until 2000. He moved to the BNZ Mödling football academy in 2000 after scouts had spotted the youngster.

Honours

Skënderbeu Korçë
 Albanian Superliga (1): 2010-11

References

1987 births
Living people
Footballers from Lower Austria
Kategoria Superiore players
FC Admira Wacker Mödling players
KF Skënderbeu Korçë players
Association football midfielders
Austrian footballers